Košarkaški klub Beko, commonly referred to as KK Beko, is a men's professional basketball club based in Belgrade, Serbia. They are currently competing in the Second Basketball League of Serbia (2nd-tier). 

The club was founded in 1986 as KK Kotež and was named after Kotež, an urban neighborhood of Palilula, Belgrade.

History

Club was founded in 1986.

Sponsorship naming
The club has had several denominations through the years due to its sponsorship:

Players 

 Miloš Ćojbašić

Coaches 

  Velisav Vesković (2008)
  Vasilije Budimić (2017–2021)
  Nenad Petronić (2021–present)

Trophies and awards

Trophies
 First Regional League of Serbia, Central Division (3rd-tier)
 Winners (3): 2006–07, 2014–15, 2021–22

Notable players 
  Alen Smailagić

Youth system
  Dejan Koturović
  Mladen Pantić
  Nenad Šulović

References

External links
 Official website 
 KK Kotež website 
 Profile at eurobasket.com
 Kotež Profile at eurobasket.com

Beko
Basketball teams established in 1986
Palilula, Belgrade